Cisco Aironet is a maker of wireless networking equipment currently operated as a division of Cisco Systems.  It was started by ex-Marconi Wireless employees in 1986 as Telesystems SLW in Canada, right after the United States Federal Communications Commission (FCC) opened up the ISM bands for spread spectrum license-free use.  Telxon acquired Telesystems SLW in 1992, and Aironet Wireless Communications was spun off from Telxon's RF Division in 1994.  Cisco Systems acquired Aironet in 1999.

One of its pre-acquisition direct competitors was NCR and its successors (AT&T and Lucent), who sold the WaveLAN wireless networking technology.

Pre-acquisition Aironet products
 ARLAN 900 MHz proprietary wireless networking
 ARLAN 2.4 GHz proprietary wireless networking

Cisco Era Aironet products 
 Aironet 700W Series
 Simultaneous dual band radio, 802.11n based, wall-plate-mountable, BandSelect, VideoStream, 4x Gb ethernet ports, one PoE port, requires a controller.
 Aironet 1100 Series (2009)
 1130
 1140 - 802.11n (2.4 GHz only), PoE, single port, ClientLink beam forming technology.
 End of Life: October 1, 2013.
 End of Software Updates: October 1, 2014.
 Aironet 1700 Series
 Aironet 1850 Series
 Aironet 1200 Series
 1240
 1250
 1250
 Aironet 1300 Outdoor Access Point/Bridge
 Aironet 2600 Series
 Aironet 2700 Series
 Aironet 2800 Series
 Aironet 3500 Series
 Aironet 3600 Series
 Aironet 3700 Series
 Aironet 3800 Series
 Aironet 4800 Series

Cisco Aironet compatible wireless controllers 
 Cisco 8540 Wireless LAN Controller
 Cisco 5520 Wireless LAN Controller
 Cisco 3504 Wireless LAN Controller
 Cisco 2500 Wireless LAN Controller
 Cisco Virtual Wireless Controller.

See also
 List of Cisco Systems acquisitions

References

External links
The WayBack Machine's archive of a page with more info on Aironet's history
1999 news release about Cisco acquiring Aironet
Linux drivers for Aironet ARLAN
Cisco End-Of-Life announcement about pre-acquisition Aironet devices

Wireless networking hardware
Cisco Systems acquisitions
Computer companies established in 1986
Networking companies of the United States
Networking hardware companies
1999 mergers and acquisitions